Feyen is a surname. Notable people with the name include:

Auguste Feyen-Perrin (1826– 1888), French painter, engraver, and illustrator
Dan Feyen, American printer and politician
Jacques-Eugène Feyen (1815–1908), French painter